Máirín Ní Dhonnchadha is an Irish academic and scholar. She is Established Professor of Old and Middle Irish and Celtic Philology at National University of Ireland, Galway. She graduated from University College, Cork, with a BA in Celtic Studies, and MAs and PhD in Old Irish and Middle Irish from Cork, Jesus College, Oxford, and the School of Celtic Studies at Dublin Institute for Advanced Studies. She has been "Assistant Editor at the Royal Irish Academy's Foclóir na Nua-Ghaeilge, a lecturer in Irish at University College, Dublin and Trinity College, Dublin, and an Assistant Professor at the School of Celtic Studies, DIAS." She has taught at Galway since 1996.

Her work covers medieval and modern Irish and its literature. She co-edited The Field Day Anthology of Irish Writing Volumes IV and V: Irish Women's Writings and Traditions in 2002.

Selected bibliography

 (Review of) J.M. Blázquez's Religiones Prerromanas (Madrid 1983)
 "Faoi Thuairim na Deorantachta (Translation of Joep Leerssen's 'Celebrating the Unfamiliar')" in Nua-Léamha, Dublin, 1996
 The Field Day Anthology of Irish Writing Volumes IV and V: Irish Women's Writings and Traditions, 2002.
 "A note on Early Irish terms for 'blue'": addendum to A paler shade of blue: the symbology of glass beads in early medieval Ireland, by Mags Mannion, Oxford, 2017.

References

External links

 nuigalway.ie
 vanhamel.nl
 nui.ie

20th-century Irish women
21st-century Irish women
Living people
Linguists from Ireland
Irish-language writers
Academics of the University of Galway
Year of birth missing (living people)